White Elephant is a 1984 British comedy drama film directed by Werner Grusch and starring Peter Firth, Peter Sarpong and Nana Seowg. The plot involves a ruthless white man determined to break through thousands of years of tradition to sell microchips in Africa. A young British businessman goes to Ghana to modernise a furniture factory by introducing computers. Unbeknownst to him, the spirits of African tradition are already working against him and are determined to make him pay. He encounters fierce resistance from the Ghanaians, and this eventually leads him to better appreciate their culture.

Cast
 Peter Firth ...  Peter Davidson
 Peter Sarpong ...  Bishop of Kumasi
 Nana Seowg ...  High Priestess
 Ejissu Jasantua ...  Fetish Priest
 Frederick Lawluwi ...  Reverend in Anloga
 A.N.K. Mensah ...  Herbalist in Anloga
 Asugebe ...  Patron Ghost of Ejissu Fetish Priest School
 Jasantua ...  Patron Ghost of Ejissu Fetish Priest School
 Nana Abiri
 Klevor Abo
 Abi Adatsi
 Owusu Akyeaw
 Samuel Amoah
 Charles Annan
 Otchere Darko
 Toni Darko
 Kwabena Holm
 Sarfo Opoku

Release
The film was briefly distributed by Troma Entertainment.

References

External links
 

1984 films
British independent films
1984 comedy-drama films
Troma Entertainment films
British comedy-drama films
1984 comedy films
1984 drama films
1984 independent films
1980s English-language films
1980s British films